Meadow Brook Farms may refer to
The Edsel and Eleanor Ford House, Grosse Point Shores, Michigan
The farming estate of Meadow Brook Hall, Rochester, Michigan